Łomnica  is a village in the administrative district of Gmina Głuszyca, within Wałbrzych County, Lower Silesian Voivodeship, in south-western Poland, close to the Czech border.

References

Villages in Wałbrzych County